Federico Javier Crivelli (born January 28, 1982) is an Argentine professional footballer who plays for Club Atlético Temperley.

References

Living people
1982 births
Argentine footballers
Argentine expatriate footballers
Argentine expatriate sportspeople in Mexico
Expatriate footballers in Mexico
Argentine Primera División players
Primera Nacional players
Liga MX players
Club Atlético Temperley footballers
Talleres de Córdoba footballers
Gimnasia y Esgrima de Jujuy footballers
Chiapas F.C. footballers
Club Atlético Tigre footballers
Boca Unidos footballers
Association football goalkeepers
Place of birth missing (living people)